Bilge Kösebalaban (born 8 February 1980) is the vocalist and guitar player for Turkish Rock band Direc-t.

He was born on the 8 February 1980 in Adana. He started his music career in the early days of his youth when he bought his first guitar during high school. He continued his music life by participating at the Milliyet’s Music contest and from where he won the first prize in Turkey for songwriting on 3 songs. Later on he moved to Ankara to continue his studies at the University of Ankara at the department of Spanish language. As he realised that music is the most important thing in his life, he quit the university and moved to Istanbul to become a professional musician. Bilge managed to get a lot of attention with his different music and singing style. During his stay in Istanbul he met with Özgür Peştimalci and they formed the band "Direc-t". "Anything I've done", one of his songs sung with Gülce Duru, has been selected as 2005 a VH1-song of the year December finalist. He has sung on Doga icin cal project a Turkish version of Playing for a change. He has also made "Arabesque Strings", a Turkish music library album for Muzikotek with Yigit Vural.

External links
Official page
Myspace page

1980 births
Living people
People from Adana
Turkish rock musicians